Faust IV is the fourth studio album by the German krautrock group Faust, released in 1973. The album is included in the book 1001 Albums You Must Hear Before You Die, where it is referred to as a "krautrock classic".  This was the last album by the first incarnation of the band, they returned in 1994 with the release of Rien featuring a different line-up.

Recording
The album was recorded at the Manor Studio in England. As the sessions took too long to complete, producer Uwe Nettelbeck opted to complete the album with material that was recorded at previous sessions in Wümme in Bremen, Germany. These additions include "Krautrock" (previously aired on the John Peel show) and "It's a Bit of a Pain" (previously released as the b-side of the "So Far" single in Germany).

Music
The opener, "Krautrock", is a drone-based instrumental with drums appearing after seven minutes, while later tracks such as "The Sad Skinhead" and "Jennifer" employ more conventional songwriting techniques.  The closing track, "It's a Bit of a Pain", combines both styles, utilising noise during its chorus. At a point late in the song, following the chorus a woman's voice speaking in Swedish is heard. The track "Just A Second" had the notation "starts like that!" added to the title on the CD reissues. The track numbering on the original CD was incorrect and misleading. The liner notes on the 2CD remaster contain many inaccuracies.

Track listing
1973 release:

The published track listing contains a number of errors. Track 5, "Giggy Smile / Picnic on a Frozen River, Deuxieme Tableau" is incorrectly listed as "Picnic on a Frozen River, Deuxieme Tableau". Track 6, "Läuft...Heisst Das Es Läuft Oder Es Kommt Bald...Läuft", is incorrectly listed as "Giggy Smile". "Run" is incorrectly listed as "Läuft...Heißt Das Es Läuft Oder Es Kommt Bald…Läuft".

Personnel
Werner "Zappi" Diermaier – drums
Hans Joachim Irmler – organ
Jean-Hervé Péron – vocals, bass
Rudolf Sosna – vocals, guitar, keyboards
Gunther Wüsthoff – synthesizer, sax

Sound and art work
Kurt Graupner – engineer
Uwe Nettelbeck – producer, cover artwork
Gunther Wüsthoff – cover artwork

Reception
Some fans of Faust's earlier work felt that it was a "sell-out" album, for suggested reasons including more "palatable" songs such as The Sad Skinhead and Jennifer which are today praised as some of the band's best lyrical work.

Madlib sampled The Sad Skinhead in 2013 for his album Rock Konducta, Pt. 1 on the track "Far Faust".

Re-release
Faust IV was re-released on two CDs in February 2006 by EMI.

References

External links
Faust IV at faust-pages.com.
News of Faust IV re-release at faust-pages.com.
Faust IV Virgin Records (V2004) LP release at Discogs.

1973 albums
Faust (band) albums
Virgin Records albums
Albums produced by Uwe Nettelbeck